Wang Wenhua (born 1954) is a retired Chinese host.

Biography
Wang was born in Baoding, Hebei, in 1954. She was conscripted into military service in 1974, during the late Cultural Revolution. Wang worked as a drama actress and announcer in Wuhan Military District before entering the Art Troupe of Political Department of the PLA Air Force. Wang entered the television industry in 1982 and she was transferred to the China Central Television (CCTV) in 1991. Her big break came in 1991 when she was host of a Chinese traditional culture program called The Best of Folk Arts.

Personal life
Wang was married to Wang Jianning.

References

1954 births
People from Baoding
Living people
CCTV television presenters